Sihina Devduwa (Sinhala: සිහින දෙව්දුව) is a 2009 Sri Lankan Sinhala drama thriller film directed by Suresh Kumarasinghe and produced by Vinu Veththamuni. It stars Saliya Sathyajith and Thesara Jayawardane in lead roles along with Indika Fernando and Rajitha Hiran. Music composed by Asela Indralal. It is the 1121st Sri Lankan film in the Sinhala cinema.

Plot

Cast
 Saliya Sathyajith as Vishwa
 Thesara Jayawardane as Natasha
 Indika Fernando
 Nanda Wickramage
 Rajitha Hiran
 Melani Asoka 
 Vinu Veththamuni

References

2009 films
2000s Sinhala-language films